Sahaviriya Steel Industries PCL or simply SSI is a Thai Multinational Steel-making company headquartered in Bangkok, Thailand. It was the largest steel sheet producer in Southeast Asia with annual capacity of 4 million tonnes of hot rolled coil, and the largest steel company in Thailand.

Sahaviriya Steel Industries has manufacturing operations in Thailand.

SSI UK

Following a period of difficult trading conditions the parent company was granted an application to wind up its UK business on 2 October 2015.

References

External links
 Official website
 SSI UK Official website

Manufacturing companies based in Bangkok
Companies listed on the Stock Exchange of Thailand